Melbourne, the capital of Victoria, Australia, was an important Victorian-era city and erected "some of the world's most majestic buildings" of the era. Several buildings survive from the period, including the State Library of Victoria (1856), Parliament House (1856), the General Post Office (1867 and 1887), the Royal Exhibition Building (1880), the Windsor Hotel (1884), the Block Arcade (1893), and the Rialto Building Group (1888–1891). However, many of the well-known architectural gems of Melbourne's Victorian central city were demolished in the 20th century. Most were lost in the 1950s-70s when Melbourne, like many other cities, sought to reinvent itself as a modern metropolis. Whelan the Wrecker was by far the most success demolition company in the period, and was responsible for almost all of these losses, but often saved items such as statuary for resale.

History 
Melbourne is a city "built on gold"; the 1850s Gold Rush resulted in a population of 300,000 by 1854. During this period of great wealth and optimism, many large public buildings were built. The Gold Rush was followed by steady growth in pastoral wealth and an urban economy based on industrial enterprises.

In the 1880s, there was another building boom in Melbourne. Land prices increased as speculators took advantage of easy credit from London and lax local financial regulations. Speculation led to the development of large, elaborate offices, hotels, and department stores in Melbourne, along with suburban subdivisions along rapidly expanding railway lines. This growth so astonished visiting journalist George Augustus Sala in 1885 that he dubbed the city "Marvelous Melbourne". Growth continued at an accelerated pace for the next five or six years, until the inevitable real estate bust.

The most architecturally significant buildings of this period were a dozen office buildings of eight or nine levels, along with the eleven-story Australian Building. These Victorian-era skyscrapers not only maximized the land but were possible because of Melbourne's newly installed pressurized water system that was needed to operate hydraulic lifts (elevators). All but two of the early skyscrapers have been demolished, leaving Stalbridge Chambers (1890) and the former National Mutual Building (1893).

The following is a list of the largest, most elaborate, or otherwise notable Victorian buildings that are lost.

The Buildings

Australian Building 
API Building or the Australian Building was on Elizabeth Street at the corner of Flinders Lane. It was the tallest building in Australia and the third tallest building in the world when it was completed in 1889. Durham formed the Australian Property Investment Co. (API) which borrowed heavily to buy the site and build the Australian Building.

The building was designed by Oakden, Addison & Kemp with John Beswicke in the Queen Anne Revival architectural style. Its exterior was finished in red brick with stone bands, topped by a gabled mansard roof and corner turret. Soon after its completion, the economy faltered and API had a surplus of empty offices, In addition, Durham's debt was greater than the market value of the building. In 1920, the Australian Provincial Assurance Association, an insurance company, bought the building as their Melbourne base and renamed it the APA Building.

It remained the tallest building in Melbourne until the late 1920s and a city landmark until its top gables and turret were removed in the 1950s. The Australian Building was demolished in 1980 with a permit from Heritage Victoria because they agreed that the cost to upgrade the building to modern fire regulations was onerous.

Craig, Williamson and Thomas Emporium 
Craig Williamson and Thomas began as a drapery in 1874. In 1883, they expanded into a four-story building on Elizabeth Street. In 1890, they expanded into an adjacent seven-story building that became the Craig, Williamson and Thomas Emporium. The emporium sold an expanded selection of fabrics, clothing, millinery, and homewares departments. The Great Fire of  22 November 1897 started in the store, and destroyed a large part of the city block, leaving the store a gutted shell and a stock loss of £100,000.

The façade was preserved and the store was rebuilt with an extension to the south. Later, there was an extension to the north and an addition of two floors, creating a much larger department store. The business closed  in 1937. In 1945, the building was sold to the Federal Government for a branch of the Commonwealth Bank. The former emporium and the adjacent Finks Building were demolished in 1969 for an office tower,

Eastern Market 
In 1847, the Melbourne City Council allocated half a block to create Eastern Market which was bounded by Bourke Street, Exhibition Street, and Little Collins Street. Starting in 1859, the market consisted of a series of open sheds. In 1877, the city council decided to rebuild the market on a grand scale. The architectural firm Reed & Barnes won a design contest for a structure featuring shops around the edge of grandly scaled two-story and three-story buildings. The structure also included a two-level central market hall topped by domed glass roofs. The new Eastern Market opened in 1879 but during its construction, its former fresh produce merchants moved to the expanded Queen Victoria Market and had little interest in returning.

In 1881, the city council leased the market to Edward Cole who operated the highly successful Coles Book Arcade. Cole filled the Eastern Market with amusements such as hoop-las, shooting galleries, and fortune tellers; second-hand stalls, a haberdashery, and fresh food vendors. After a year, the city council resumed control, but the Eastern Market never fulfilled its intended purpose. It remained low-rent retail and part of the amusement nightlife of Bourke Street for many decades. By the 1950s, the amusement business had faded, and the central hall became a car park and taxi depot. The city council began negotiations for a hotel and had Whelan's demolish the Eastern Market in 1960.

Equitable Building 
The headquarters of the Equitable Life Assurance Society of the United States opened at 316 Collins Street at the intersection of Elizabeth Street in 1896. German-born American architect Edward Raht designed it as "the grandest building in the Southern Hemisphere and to last forever". His design was in the style of the skyscrapers of New York City with an internal steel frame covered by granite blocks. The seven-story structure consisted of a stack of classical floors that were massively proportioned. At , it was one of the tallest buildings in Melbourne at the time. Its construction took five years and cost £500,000.

In 1923, the Equitable Building became the Victoria headquarters of Colonial Mutual Life. By the mid-1950s, Colonia Mutual contemplated demolition, as Victorian-era buildings were considered outdated, ostentatious, and gloomy. It was demolished in 1959. The statuary group over the entrance was saved and placed outside the Baillieu Library at the University of Melbourne, and some of the carved elements were salvaged and remain with private owners. In 2000, a sample was purchased by Museums Victoria and displayed outside its Carlton Campus on Nicholson Street.

Federal Coffee Palace 
Federal Coffee Palace was on the western end of Melbourne’s premier thoroughfare, Collins Street. James Munro and James Mirams—both politicians, businessmen, and teetotalers—held a design contest for their alcohol-free coffee palace and hotel. The building featured Second Empire style, following the designs of Ellerker & Kilburn and William Pitt, the first and second prize contest winners, respectively.

The Federal Coffee Palace opened in time for Melbourne's Centennial Exhibition in July 1888. The first floors included billiards, dining, lounging, reading, and smoking rooms. Its decor was so unique that the building became a tourist attraction. Its upper five floors included nearly 400 luxury bedrooms. The Age wrote that the £150,000 hotel was one of "Australia's most splendid" buildings; in fact, it was "one of the largest and most opulent hotels in the world". Its guests included Alexander Graham Bell, Herbert Hoover, and Mark Twain.

Despite its opulence, the Federal Coffee Palace was never a competition for Melbourne’s other luxury hotels—the Menzies Hotel and the Hotel Windsor—perhaps due to its size and location that was far from the retail and social center of town. In 1923, the hotel gave up on temperance and applied for a liquor license. At this time, it was renamed the Federal Hotel. A renovation in the late 1960s was not enough to revitalize the struggling business, and it closed in 1972. The building was demolished in 1973 to make way for an office tower that was, in turn, demolished in 2019.

Fink's Building 
Located on the northeast corner of Elizabeth Street and Flinders Street, the Fink's Building was a ten-story office building. It was briefly Australia's tallest building when completed in1888. Architects Twentyman & Askew designed it for Benjamin Fink, a speculative developer. The elaborate Renaissance Revival style Fink's Building had a high mansard roof that encompassed its top two stories. When the real estate market crashed, Fink fled to England, leaving behind debts of £1,520,000; he was declared bankrupt in 1892.

The building was gutted by the great fire of 1897 which swept across the block bounded by Flinders Street, Elizabeth Street, Flinders Lane, and Swanston Street. The brick carcass remained intact and was rebuilt in 1898, minus the attic floors. In 1969, Commonwealth Bank owned the building and demolished it, along with the adjacent Craig Williamson and Thomas Emporium, to make way for a modern office tower.

Fish Market 
The Melbourne City Council built the Fish Market buildings between 1890 and 1892 to replace an existing market at the corner of Swanston Street and Flinders Street. The Fish Market was on the western end of Flinders Street, between King Street and Spencer Street. The part facing Flinders Street housed general markets and storage, while the fish market itself was on the other side of the new railway viaduct, facing the river. It served as Melbourne's commercial fish market for more than fifty years.

R. G. Gordon won the design competition for the Fish Market, designed with the assistance of Gerhardt Brown. The Gothic Revival style buildings featured tall conical turrets, and a large clock tower, though the clock was never installed. Described at the time of its completion as one of the finest set of market buildings in the world, the Fish Market was also controversial, running 22% over budget at £220,000.

By the 1950s, the market was surrounded by busy roads and could not accommodate the increasing volume. The city council decided to build new markets in West Melbourne and hired Whelan's to demolish the Fish Market in 1959. Its elaborate wrought-iron gates were saved and are now at the entrance to Fawkner Cemetery. The site of the Fish Market was initially used as a car park. The riverside portion of the property eventually became Batman Park. In the early 2000s, the Flinders Street portion was developed into apartment buildings.

Menzies Hotel 
Reed & Barnes designed the Menzies Hotel for Scottish immigrants Archibald and Catherine Menzies. It was built on the crest of the hill on Bourke Street and the southeast corner of William Street for £32,000. The three-story hotel featured a columned arcade and a corner pavilion tower. When it opened in November 1867, it was Melbourne's first grand hotel and was immediately popular with international visitors and wealthy pastoralists. In 1896, two additional stories and a corner tower were added, along with electric lights, telephones, and a lift  (elevator). The six-story Bourke Street wing was added in 1922, providing en suite bathrooms and an enlarged dining room.

The Menzies Hotel hosted Mark Twain, Alexander Graham Bell, Herbert Hoover, and Dame Nellie Melba. In 1942, it became the South-West Pacific headquarters for General Douglas MacArthur for several months during World War II. The hotel was demolished in 1969 to make way for the BHP Tower.

Parer's Crystal Café Hotel 
Juan, Felipe, and Estevan Parer—three brothers who immigrated to Australia from Catalonia in the 1850s—built Parer’s Crystal Café Hotel on Bourke Street in 1886. The hotel featured billiard rooms, a café, clubrooms, a saloon, and lavish dining rooms. It had a staff of eighty and hotel rooms that accommodated more than 650 guests. Leavitt’s Guide wrote, "Its wealth of mirrors so fantastically arranged, its tessellated floor, glittering tables, refreshing fountains and artistic draperies, remind one of the magnificent structures of a similar kind which grace the capitals of Europe and America."

Parer’s Crystal Café Hotel was demolished by Whelan's in October 1960. The site became Walton's department store, followed by Midcity Village Cinemas. In 2019, it was a Hello Kitty store.

Prell's Buildings 

Friedrich Wilhelm Prell was born in Hamburg, Germany, and migrated to Australia at the age of 21. There, he founded the import/export business of F. W. Prell and Company Limited. In 1886, the vice-president of the Otis Elevator Company, W. F. Hall, visited Melbourne from the United States and had a conversation with Prell, noting that Sydney had six Otis hydraulic lifts in operation, while Melbourne had none. Hall remarked that men who had to climb stairs in Melbourne's offices would do so with great difficulty, reaching the top floor with "aching legs, a fluttering heart, and a firm resolution to do business elsewhere".

In response, Prell built a five-story office building on the northwest corner of Queen Street, to which he added Otis safety elevators that operated using water pressure. Prell planned two more buildings, one of seven stories and one of nine stories. His plan changed to three nine-story office buildings in the same block of Queen Street, between Collins Street and Flinders Street. F. M. White and Sons designed the three complementary buildings in  Renaissance Revival style. They were constructed between 1888 and 1889. By July 1889, the city's high-pressure hydraulic system was improved and all of Prell's high-rise buildings were connected to it. Collectively known as Prell's Buildings, these structures dominated the southern aspect of the city and were known as "Towers of Babel of the elevator type”.

All four of Prell's Buildings were demolished between 1967 and 1980.

Robbs Building 
Robb hired architect Thomas Watts to design his building. The Robbs Building consisted of five stories plus a basement, with large spaces that could be used for offices or retail. It had three separate entrances, each with lifts (elevators) and stairs. The exterior featured vertical piers topped with Corinthian columns that spanned its five-stories.

Though successful as an investment, the building suffered from mishaps. In March 1888, a lift wire broke, causing an elevator to crash to the ground. In August 1889, a fire started on the top floor, destroying documents of tenants such as the Railway Office. In addition, water from the fire brigade damaged the Traffic Audit Office and the bank that occupied the ground floor corner. When the real estate market crashed in the early 1890s, Robb was heavily indebted and was declared bankrupt in 1894, owing £653,000. By the 1920s, the two eastern bays were separately known as Dudley Buildings and sold for £88,000 in 1926. The Dudley Buildings were demolished in 1975.

In the 1970s, National Mutual acquired the Robbs Building and the nearby Rialto Building Group. In January 1981, National Mutual sold the site. The new owner, the Grollo Group, revealed plans for a trio of high-rise office towers that would replace the Robbs Building. Their plan was stymied for a few months when the Builders Labourer's Federation (BLF) placed a ban on the demolition of the Robbs Building. There was also community opposition to its demolition. BLF lifted the ban in November 1981 and demolition of the Robbs Building commenced in early 1982. The Rialto Towers were completed in October 1986 and the site of the Robbs Building became an open plaza. Between 2015 and 2017, that plaza and the forecourt of the Rialto Towers were turned into office buildings.

Victoria Building and Queens Walk 
The Freehold Investment & Banking Co., one of the many land banks of the real estate boom years, built the Victoria Building in the heart of town on the corner Swanston and Collins Streets, opposite the Melbourne Town Hall. Designed by architect David Wormal, the building’s Renaissance Revival façade was topped by a lively roofline of mansards and pediments. Completed in 1888, the Victoria Building housed the Freehold Investment & Banking Co. on the corner, as well as numerous shops, and three floors of offices above. The building was in two parts, separated by an L shaped walkway called Queens Walk which contained some shopfronts and connected Collins Street to Swanston Street. A statue of Queen Victoria sat on the corner beneath the building’s landmark tall diagonal roof (the latter was removed by 1910). 

Queens Walk was initially challenged by sewage problems, with the City of Melbourne's Inspector of Nuisances receiving several complaints from the building's occupants in the 1890s. In 1922 the walkway was refurbished as an arcade, with more shops, a glass roof, large leaded-glass cupolas at the entrances, and was renamed Queens Walk Arcade. Later, the arcade included twenty shops with tenants such as Cavalier Tea Rooms, Drummunds, tailor Henry Bucks, and the Savage Club.The Victorian Government Tourist Bureau, an arm of the Victorian Railways, occupied the corner shop from 1908 to 1940, later occupied by Henry Bucks menswear. The Victoria Building was sold in 1963 and demolished in 1966 for potential high-rise development. However, the City of Melbourne purchased the vacant site for its new City Square, which was completed in 1980. The square was replaced in 2000, and the replacement was itself demolished in 2018 as part of works for the Melbourne Metro.

Other lost buildings 
 Bank of New South Wales Building (1857), 360 Collins Street, demolished in 1933, with the facade saved and re-erected at Melbourne University. 
 Bijou Theatre (1876), Bourke Street, demolished in 1934
 Cliveden Mansions (1887), Wellington Parade, demolished in 1968
 Coles Book Arcade (1883), Bourke Street, demolished in 1929
 Colonial Bank of Australasia (1882), corner of Elizabeth Street and Little Collins Street, demolished in 1932 (Its sculptural doorway was re-erected at the University of Melbourne)
 Masonic Hall (1886), Collins Street, demolished 1971–72 for Collins Place
 Melbourne Hebrew Congregation Synagogue (1841), 476 Bourke Street, demolished in 1929
 Melbourne Hospital, later Queen Victoria Hospital, corner of Swanston and Lonsdale Streets, demolished in 1990, except for the central pavilion 
 Oriental Bank (1856), corner of Queen Street and Flinders Lane, demolished 
 Oriental Hotel (1857), Collins Street, demolished 1971–72 for Collins Place
 St Patrick's College, East Melbourne, demolished in 1971
 St Patrick's Hall (1851), 470 Bourke Street, demolished in 1957
 Scott's Hotel (1860), 444 Collins Street, demolished in 1964 
 Temple Court (1857), Collins Street, demolished and replaced by a larger building of the same name in 1923
 Western Market (1841), bounded by Market Street, Collins Street, William Street, Flinders Lane, Exhibition Street, and Little Collins Street, demolished in 1961

References 

Melbourne
Australian historic places
Victorian architecture in Australia
Demolished buildings and structures in Melbourne
Renaissance Revival architecture in Australia
Gothic Revival architecture in Melbourne
Second Empire architecture in Australia
Queen Anne architecture in Australia